Abacetus marginibasis is a species of ground beetle in the subfamily Pterostichinae. It was described by Straneo in 1963.

References

marginibasis
Beetles described in 1963